Princess Chulabhorn of Thailand, the Princess Srisavangavadhana (born 4 July 1957) is a princess of Thailand, the youngest daughter of King Bhumibol Adulyadej and Queen Sirikit, and the younger sister of King Vajiralongkorn. She is officially styled Her Royal Highness Princess Chulabhorn, which corresponds to her full Thai title Somdet Phrachao Nong Nang Thoe Chaofa Chulabhorn Walailak Agrarajakumari.

Education
Princess Chulabhorn studied chemistry and graduated in 1979 from the Faculty of Science at Kasetsart University, with a Bachelor of Science, First Class Honours. She continued to study Science at Mahidol University, where she received her Doctorate in 1985.

She is heavily involved in the promotion of scientific research, and regularly gives awards and prizes. She held the position of a guest lecturer in chemistry at the Mahidol University. She also serves as president of the Chulabhorn Research Institute. She was awarded the UNESCO Einstein Medal for her efforts in promoting scientific collaboration in 1986 and was the first Asian to be invited to join the Royal Society of Chemistry in the United Kingdom as an Honorary Fellow.

Later in 2019, She received a Ph.D. in Visual Arts from the Faculty of Painting, Sculpture and Graphic Arts, Silpakorn University.

Marriage
 
In 1981, Chulabhorn married Royal Thai Air Force officer Group Captain Virayudh Tishyasarin, a commoner, an Air vice-marshal. According to royal custom, she would have lost her title upon marrying a man of lower rank. However, her father granted her special permission to keep the title Chao Pha even after her marriage.

Issue

Honours and awards

Military rank
 General, admiral and air chief marshal

Volunteer Defense Corps of Thailand rank
 Volunteer Defense Corps Colonel

Academic rank
 Professor of Navaminda Kasatriyadhiraj Royal Thai Air Force Academy (27 June 1986 – 1 October 1986)
 Professor in Organic Chemistry of Mahidol University

Foreign honours
 : Paulownia Dame Grand Cordon of the Order of the Precious Crown
  Nepalese Royal Family: Member Grand Cross of the Most Glorious Order of the Benevolent Ruler
 : Knight Grand Cross of the Order of Orange-Nassau
 : Knight Grand Cross of the Order of Merit for Distinguished Services
 : Knight Grand Cross of the Order of Isabella the Catholic
 : Member Grand Cross of the Royal Order of the Seraphim
 : Honorary Dame Grand Cross of the Royal Victorian Order

Ancestry

References

External links
The Royal Family | Chulabhorn
Chulabhorn Receives International Research Award

1957 births
Living people
Mahidol family
Thai princesses
Thai female Chao Fa
Royal Thai Army generals
Royal Thai Air Force air marshals
Thai admirals
Academic staff of Mahidol University
Thai women academics
Knights Grand Cordon of the Order of Chula Chom Klao
Knights Grand Cross of the Order of the Direkgunabhorn
Order of the Precious Crown members
Grand Cordons of the Order of the Precious Crown
Recipients of the Order of Orange-Nassau
Knights Grand Cross of the Order of Orange-Nassau
Recipients of the Order of Isabella the Catholic
Knights Grand Cross of the Order of Isabella the Catholic
Honorary Dames Grand Cross of the Royal Victorian Order
Mahidol University alumni
Kasetsart University alumni
Thai people of Mon descent
Children of Bhumibol Adulyadej
21st-century Thai women scientists
20th-century Thai women scientists
20th-century Chakri dynasty
21st-century Chakri dynasty
Daughters of kings